The Royal Dutch Mint (Koninklijke Nederlandse Munt, abbreviated KNM) based in Houten, the Netherlands, is a company owned by Heylen Group. It was established and previously owned by the Dutch state.

History
On 17 September 1806, when The Netherlands were under the rule of King Louis Napoleon, he decided that the striking and distribution of coins should be by a single, national body. This was in contrast to the Middle Ages custom of large trading cities having their own mint and coins, which resulted in several coins circulating within the country, and many levels of controlling bureaucracy.

Originally it was the intention to found the mint in the capital city of Amsterdam but, since there was insufficient finance available, it was decided to locate the National Mint seat in Utrecht.

After Napoleon was defeated in 1813, and the Kingdom of the Netherlands was founded with William I as King, the Mint was renamed as  's Rijks Munt. What is now known as Belgium was a part of the new kingdom, and a second Mint was located in Brussels. When Belgium achieved independence in 1839, the Rijks Munt became the only mint in the Kingdom of the Netherlands. The provincial coins had been minted before the unification of the Mint were still in circulation. Due to their relatively high intrinsic value, the "new" coins would only gain popularity with the passage of time. In 1849 the provincial coins were officially taken out of circulation.

In 1901 the company was placed under the supervision of the Ministry of Finance, and in 1912 the Mint officially became a company owned by the State. At the end of the German occupation during the Second World War, in 1944, coins were produced in the United States. This was necessary to ensure that there would be enough currency available after the liberation.

In 1994  's Rijks Munt was renamed as De Nederlandse Munt NV. It became a company, 100% of whose shares are owned by the Dutch State. The Queen awarded the company the prefix Koninklijk (Royal) five years later, and the company was now allowed to call itself De Koninklijke Nederlandse Munt (The Royal Dutch Mint). On 22 November 2016 the Royal Dutch Mint was sold to the Belgian Groep Heylen.

Production
Since 2002 the Royal Dutch Mint has been allowed to strike coins for foreign national banks in the euro zone, and occasionally strikes coins for other countries such as Latvia, Guatemala and Honduras. Furthermore, the Dutch Royal Mint produces commemorative coins, coins intended for collectors, medals and royal decorations.

The Royal Dutch Mint was also delegated the task of destroying the old guilders after their replacement by the euro in 2002.

Sources and references

elaborating about the Royal Dutch Mint (in English)

Government-owned companies of the Netherlands
Companies based in Utrecht (province)
Dutch
Mints of Europe
Organisations based in the Netherlands with royal patronage
Rijksmonuments in Utrecht (city)
Organisations based in Utrecht (city)
1567 establishments in the Holy Roman Empire